iFilm is a discontinued U.S.-based video-sharing website on which users could upload, share and view videos. It was founded by filmmaker Raphael Raphael in 1997. It was later acquired by iFilm.net, a popular online interactive film and media archive, originally specializing in independent films. Ifilm.net was founded in 1998 by new media entrepreneurs Roger Raderman, J. Patrick Forden, and Luke McDonough. Percepticon Corporation engineered and built the website and content publishing system. Greg Deocampo, the founding CTO, developed the core engineering team, encoding network, presentation engine, and ad serving network. Its URL is now owned by Defy Media.

Company history
iFilm was founded in 1997 by filmmaker Raphael Raphael as a thinktank for artists and technicians about future directions of film. Raphael sold the domain to Rodger Raderman, founder of iFilm.net. The original intent of iFilm was to make short, independent films available online. It rejected home movies and pornography, but was open to all other film types. By August 1999, the site had over 450 movies, offices in New York, Los Angeles, and San Francisco, and employed 40+ people. Also during the summer of 1999, film editor Andrew Hindes and former sales and marketing head of Variety (magazine) Coco Jones joined the iFilm team. "If the consumer thinks about 'films', then we want them to come to iFilm as their first point of entry," said founder Rodger Raderman. "We see ourselves as the portal – the first stop on the web for all things film-related."

iFilm had many high-profile investors, such as Axiom Ventures, Inc., Eastman Kodak, Liberty Digital, Rainbow Media (Now AMC Networks, Sony Pictures Entertainment, Vulcan Inc., and Yahoo!.

iFilm suffered serious losses in 2000 as a result of the dot-com bubble bust. It reorganized under CEO Kevin Wendel in 2001 rebounded with a new focus on viral video. Prior to 2005, when YouTube did not yet exist, iFilm was the destination for online viral videos.

Acquisition
On October 15, 2005, under CEO Blair Harrison iFilm was purchased by Viacom for $49 million, with the hopes of creating their own user-generated YouTube rival. Instead, in December 2006, iFilm was bundled with MTV Networks' entertainment group. iFilm had a brief life with MTV Networks. On January 13, 2006, a television series presented as a collaboration between iFilm and VH1 entitled Web Junk 20 debuted on VH1. The show was marginally popular, airing for 3 seasons.

Rebranding
Erik Flannigan, MTV Networks' VP of digital media, suggested that the core audience of iFilm, who were primarily young males, aligned perfectly with Viacom's Spike. During the first quarter of 2008, the two brands were merged. The iFilm brand was no more and re-branded and re-purposed as Spike.com. The content of Spike.com was set to be composed of Spike programming, Comedy Central clips, GameTrailers and MTV videos. When Defy Media bought the URL from Viacom in 2014, it changed it so it redirects to Defy property Screen Junkies.

Investors
iFilm had many high-profile investors, such as Axiom Ventures, Inc., Eastman Kodak, Liberty Digital, Rainbow Media (now AMC Networks), Sony Pictures Entertainment, Vulcan Inc., and Yahoo!.

See also
 YouTube
 Google Video
 Metacafe
 Revver
 vMix
 blip.tv
 Videosift

References

 Rodger Raderman's iFilm Tumbler
 AdAge: Once considered a YouTube rival, MTV does away with iFilm
 iMedia Connection: iFilm's Fisk explores new digital landscape
 PaidContent.org: After being merged with Spike TV's site, MTV to remove iFilm brand next year
 Variety: Viacom goes online for $49 million
 The Independent: iFilm Network
 New York Times: Film's digital potential has Hollywood on edge

External links
 Screen Junkies

American film websites
Internet properties established in 1997
Internet properties disestablished in 2008
Former Viacom subsidiaries
Former video hosting services
Video hosting